Malin Kenneth Oshman (July 9, 1940 – August 6, 2011) was an American business person and Silicon Valley pioneer. Oshman and three former classmates from Rice University founded ROLM, initially a maker of rugged military computers, in 1969. In 1988, he became chief executive officer of Echelon Corporation.

References

1940 births
2011 deaths
American businesspeople
Stanford University alumni
Silicon Valley people